Jatmai Mata Mandir or Jatmayi Temple is a Hindu temple of Goddess Durga ji located in Gariaband district, 80 km from state capital Raipur, Chhattisgarh, India. The water streams just adjacent to the temple of Mata touch her feet and fall down from the rocks. According to local beliefs, these water streams are the servants of the mother. Every year a fair is organized in the temple of Mata in the Navratri of Chaitra and Kunwar.

This temple of Jatmai Mata is built between the waterfalls; hence it is also one of the most popular picnic spots in Chhattisgarh.

There is also another temple named Ghatarani temple, located 25 km from the Jatamai Mata Mandir.

See also
 Danteshwari Temple
 Mata Kaushalya Temple
 Mahamaya Temple

References

External links

Hindu temples in Chhattisgarh